Greenville Junction is an unincorporated village in the town of Greenville, Piscataquis County, Maine, United States. Greenville Junction has a post office with ZIP code 04442.

References

Villages in Piscataquis County, Maine
Villages in Maine